The 2017 Paris–Roubaix was a road cycling one-day race that took place on 9 April 2017. It was the 115th edition of the Paris–Roubaix and was  the fifteenth event of the 2017 UCI World Tour.

The average speed of 45.2 km/h was a record.

Teams
As Paris-Roubaix is a UCI World Tour event, all 18 UCI World Teams were invited automatically and were obliged to send a squad. In February 2017, the race organisers announced the seven UCI Professional Continental teams that had received wildcard invitations, completing the 25-team peloton.

Result

References

2017 UCI World Tour
2017 in French sport
2017
April 2017 sports events in France